Géza Révész (31 August 1902 – 22 January 1977) was a Hungarian military officer and politician, who served as Minister of Defence between 1957 and 1960. During the Hungarian Soviet Republic and the Second World War he fought in the Red Army. From 1960 to 1963 he was the Hungarian ambassador to the Soviet Union.

References
 Magyar Életrajzi Lexikon

1902 births
1977 deaths
People from Sátoraljaújhely
Hungarian Communist Party politicians
Members of the Hungarian Working People's Party
Members of the Hungarian Socialist Workers' Party
Defence ministers of Hungary
Members of the National Assembly of Hungary (1958–1963)
Members of the National Assembly of Hungary (1963–1967)
Ambassadors of Hungary to the Soviet Union
Hungarian soldiers
Soviet military personnel of World War II